Joss Moudoumbou Didiba (born 7 November 1997) is a Cameroonian professional footballer who plays for Trinity Zlín.

Club career

Italian tenure
Didiba made his debut on 8 December 2015 against Novara in Serie B. He joined Juventus on loan in January 2016.

FK Senica
Didiba joined Senica in the summer of 2019. From early on, he became a starting line-up regular. 

Didiba made his Fortuna Liga debut in the premier round of the season, on 20 July 2019, in a home fixture against AS Trenčín. Didiba came on as a late second-half replacement for Lovro Cvek, as Senica was in a 2:1 lead. While Trenčín had taken the lead through former Slovak international David Depetris, Senica came back by two goals from Eneji Moses. While Didiba was on the pitch, during stoppage time, Frank Castañeda had managed to convert a penalty to finalise the score at 3:1.

On 23 August 2019, during a home fixture against ViOn Zlaté Moravce, Didiba had scored his first goal for Senica. From the 17th minute, Senica had trailed after a goal by Tomáš Ďubek, but Didiba had equaled the score some 10 minutes later. Ďubek had scored again in the second half and was soon followed by Senad Jarović, bringing the match total to 1:3. Didiba had scored once more in October, during a 1:4 victory over Nitra at pod Zoborom.

During early spring part of the 2019–20 season, Didiba enjoyed a brief spell as a captain of Senica, following a mass exodus of foreign first-team players, due to financial troubles of the club.

References

External links
Joss Didiba at Footballdatabase

Living people
1997 births
Footballers from Douala
Association football midfielders
Cameroonian footballers
Cameroonian expatriate footballers
Cameroon youth international footballers
A.C. Perugia Calcio players
Matera Calcio players
S.S. Ebolitana 1925 players
FK Senica players
SFC Opava players
Serie B players
Serie C players
Serie D players
Slovak Super Liga players
Czech First League players
Czech National Football League players
Cameroonian expatriate sportspeople in Italy
Cameroonian expatriate sportspeople in Slovakia
Cameroonian expatriate sportspeople in the Czech Republic
Expatriate footballers in Italy
Expatriate footballers in Slovakia
Expatriate footballers in the Czech Republic
FC Fastav Zlín players